Johan Alm (born January 28, 1992) is a Swedish professional ice hockey defenceman who is currently playing with Djurgårdens IF of the HockeyAllsvenskan (Allsv).

Playing career
Undrafted, Alm played as a youngster in his native Sweden with Skellefteå AIK. He made his senior Swedish Hockey League (SHL) debut with Frölunda HC during the 2009–10 season, before returning to Skellefteå for the 2010–11 campaign. In 2013 and 2014, he won the Swedish championship with the club.

On May 28, 2014, Alm was signed to a two-year entry-level contract with the Nashville Predators of the National Hockey League (NHL). During his two years in the Predators' organization, he did not see any playing time in the NHL and made 81 appearances for Nashville's AHL affiliate, the Milwaukee Admirals.

On May 30, 2016, he inked a deal to return to his native Sweden with former club, Skellefteå AIK of the SHL. Alm played two seasons in his third stint within the organization before leaving as a free agent following the 2018–19 season.

Following two seasons with IK Oskarshamn, Alm left the SHL and opted to sign a one-year contract in the HockeyAllsvenskan, with newly relegated club, Djurgårdens IF on 30 September 2022.

Career statistics

Regular season and playoffs

International

Awards and honors

References

External links

1992 births
Living people
Djurgårdens IF Hockey players
Frölunda HC players
Milwaukee Admirals players
IK Oskarshamn players
Skellefteå AIK players
Swedish ice hockey defencemen
People from Skellefteå Municipality
VIK Västerås HK players
Sportspeople from Västerbotten County